Magazines.com LLC is a privately held American e-commerce company. As the internet's oldest and largest print magazine retailer, Magazines.com is directly authorized by publishers to sell subscriptions. The magazines listed on Magazines.com cover a variety of subjects, such as political commentary, lifestyle, health, and hobbies.

With prices that are updated daily, we want to give customers the best (and lowest) prices approved by the publishers of their favorite magazines. These special offers are regularly updated to provide amazing deals and huge discounts on customers’ favorite publications.

History

Founded in 1999 by entrepreneur Jay Clarke, Magazines.com was originally intended as a central location for discovering and subscribing to print magazines. Early investors included Time Inc. and Meredith Corporation, although the latter quickly sold its shares to Time Inc. In 2017, however, Meredith Corporation acquired Time Inc., thereby becoming the primary investor in Magazines.com.

In the fall of 2021, IAC’s Dotdash digital publishing unit acquired Meredith Corporation’s National Media Group. This entity consisted of its digital and magazine businesses, combining the digital publishing model of Dotdash with Meredith’s brand portfolio, scale, and loyal audience.

While Magazines.com was initially situated in the Nashville suburb of Franklin, Tennessee (with a satellite location in New Jersey), its base of operations changed after Meredith Corporation took over. Currently, operations for Magazines.com are situated in Des Moines and New York.

Products 
Magazines.com sells subscriptions to a variety of print publications, including titles targeted at readers of all ages. These are listed within main categories such as lifestyle, health, entertainment, and hobbies. The website also offers access to select journals, newspapers, and comic book series.

In addition to current subscriptions, Magazines.com sells back issues for several magazines, such as Entertainment Weekly, Country Gardens, and Magnolia Journal. These back issues are available for a flat fee.

Several top titles from Magazines.com offer full-length books, which customers can purchase directly from the website. Many of these are published by lifestyle magazines such as Better Homes & Gardens or Southern Living.

Services 
Magazines.com strives to simplify the process of subscribing to magazines and the long-term complications of maintaining these subscriptions. Customers who subscribe through the website receive automatic renewals to ensure uninterrupted service.

Both payments and renewals can be managed directly from subscribers' Magazines.com accounts. Cancellation is available at the customer's request. Upon canceling, customers receive refunds for all unsent issues.

Many customers use Magazines.com to give subscriptions as gifts for loved ones. The company accommodates this by offering tailored gift-giving solutions. This involves shipping to a separate address.

References

Online retailers of the United States
Companies based in Franklin, Tennessee
Retail companies established in 1990
Internet properties established in 1990